Goran Petrović (born 1961 in Kraljevo, Serbia) is a Serbian writer and academic.

Biography
Goran Petrović studied Yugoslav and Serbian literature at the University of Belgrade Faculty of Philology. He received the most prominent award in Serbian literature, the NIN Award, in 2000, for his novel Ситничарница „Код срећне руке". Currently he works and lives in Belgrade. Petrović is a member of the Serbian Literary Association, the Serbian PEN Centre and the Serbian Academy of Sciences and Arts.

Goran Petrović has published one hundred and fifteen editions and the following books: the short prose pieces Савети за лакши живот (Advices for an Easier Living, 1989), novel Атлас описан небом (Atlas Described by Sky, 1993), collection of short stories Острво и околне приче (The Island and Stories Around, 1996), novel Опсада цркве Светог Спаса (The Siege of the Church of Holy Ascension, 1997), novel Ситничарница "Код срећне руке" (Sundries Shop "at The Lucky Hands", 2000), collection of short stories Ближњи (Next of Kin, 2002), selected short prose book Све што знам о времену (Everything I Know About the Time, 2003), play Скела (The Ferry, 2004), collection of short stories Разлике (Differences, 2006), the book of writings Претраживач (Browser, 2007), novella Испод таванице која се љуспа (Below the fragmented ceiling, 2010) and play Матица (The Nut, 2011). Some of his novels and stories have been adapted for theatre, television, and radio. Among them is the novel Siege of the Church of Saint Salvation that was dramatized and directed as a play by Kokan Mladenović, at the National Theatre of Sombor.

Petrović’s novels and books of selected stories have been published in over fifty editions translated in languages such as French, German, Russian, Spanish, Italian, Bulgarian, Slovenian, Polish, Ukrainian, Macedonian, English and Dutch. About fifty Petrović’s stories have been published separately in Russian, English, French, Spanish, German, Polish, Czech, Greek, Ukrainian, Bulgarian, Slovenian, Macedonian, Belarusian, Hungarian, while about twenty have been included into anthologies of Serbian short stories in country and abroad.

Awards
Goran Petrović has received many awards and prizes including the NIN Award for the Novel of the Year, the Ivo Andrić Award, the Meša Selimović Award, the scholarship for literature from the Borislav Pekić Foundation, Prosveta Award, Serbian National Library Award for the most read book of the year, Golden Bestseller Award, Borisav Stanković Award.

Works
 Saveti za lakši život (1989)
 Atlas opisan nebom (1993)
 Ostrvo i okolne priče (1996)
 Opsada crkve Svetog Spasa (1997)
 Sitničarnica Kod srećne ruke (2000)
 Bližnji (2002)
 Sve što znam o vremenu (2003)
 Skela (2004)
 Razlike (2006)
 Pretraživač (2007)
 Ispod tavanice koja se ljuspa (2010) 
 Matica (2011)
 Unutrašnje dvorište (2018)
 Papir sa vodenim znakom (2022)
 Ikonostas (2022)

References

1961 births
Living people
Serbian male short story writers
Serbian short story writers
Serbian novelists
University of Belgrade Faculty of Philology alumni
People from Kraljevo